Bisaro is a surname. Notable people with the surname include:

 Kiara Bisaro (born 1975), Canadian mountain biker
 Wendy Bisaro, Canadian teacher and politician